Ceyhan station is the railway station of Ceyhan, that is served by two regional and one long-distance line.

References

Ceyhan
Buildings and structures in Adana Province
Railway stations in Adana Province
Railway stations opened in 1912
1912 establishments in the Ottoman Empire